Bruatorpsån or Torsåsån is a river in Sweden. Almost the entire catchment area lies in Torsås Municipality in Kalmar County.

References

Rivers of Kalmar County